Georgina Leonidas (born 28 February 1990) is a British actress best known for playing Molly in The Basil Brush Show, and Katie Bell in Harry Potter and the Half-Blood Prince and Harry Potter and the Deathly Hallows – Part 2.

Early life
Leonidas was born in London, the daughter of a Greek Cypriot father and an English mother. She also has Welsh ancestry through her mother. She has an older brother Dimitri and older sister Stephanie, both of whom are also actors.

Career
Leonidas's first role was in 1999, when she played Little Cosette in Les Misérables on stage in London. She was then cast as Molly in The Basil Brush Show in 2002, appearing in every episode of series 1–4, then at different times from series 5 onwards.

After the Basil Brush show ended, she guest starred in the BBC TV series Holby City as Ali Jarvis in the episode "Stargazer" in early 2007, before being cast for the film Harry Potter and the Half-Blood Prince, as Katie Bell, Harry's fellow Gryffindor Quidditch player, on 19 December 2007, as well as voicing Katie in the associated video game. She then starred in the leading role of Maya in the short film Baghdad Express in 2008, and during 2009, she appeared alongside fellow Harry Potter star Isabella Laughland in the short film Driftwood, in New Tricks on 30 July 2009, as Kiraz Yilmaz in the episode "Fresh Starts", then as the Matron's Daughter in the film Nine, and as Andra in a BBC Switch adaptation of the Greek Myth The Fall Of Icarus.

Leonidas reprised her role of Katie Bell in Harry Potter and the Deathly Hallows – Part 1 and Harry Potter and the Deathly Hallows – Part 2 in 2010 and 2011, before appearing in the stage play The Real Thing and the film Papadopoulos & Sons in a small role during 2012. She has also appeared in several videos filmed by fellow Harry Potter star Jessie Cave for her website www.pindippy.com. During 2013, she played the lead role of Simone in the short film Untouchable, appeared as Gemma Raven in the CBBC series Wizards vs Aliens episodes 'The Curse Of Crowe' parts 1 and 2, and performed as Izzy in the Polly Stenham play That Face at London's Landor Theatre during November and December 2013. During 2014, she appeared as Lucía Amory in the Agatha Christie play Black Coffee, and then as Belle in Beauty and the Beast at the Theatre Royal in Windsor during December 2014, During 2016, she appeared as Millie in the play Small Hours.

Filmography

Film

Television

Theatre

Other

References

External links

Untouchable – Youtube

Living people
1990 births
20th-century English actresses
21st-century English actresses
Actresses from London
English child actresses
English film actresses
English stage actresses
English television actresses
English people of Greek Cypriot descent
English people of Welsh descent